Natal, South Africa can refer to:

 Natalia Republic, a Boer republic (1839–1843)
 Colony of Natal, a British colony (1843–1910)
 Natal (province), a province of South Africa (1910–1994)
 KwaZulu-Natal, a province of South Africa (1994–present)
 Natal (region), a geographical area within South Africa

See also
 Zulu Kingdom, an African monarchy co-existent with, and later part of, the Colony of Natal (1816–1897)
 KwaZulu, a bantustan in South Africa (1981–1994)

Geography of South Africa